Cyril Stapleton (31 December 1914 – 25 February 1974) was an English violinist and jazz bandleader.

Biography
Born Horace Cyril Stapleton in Mapperley, Nottingham, England, Stapleton began playing violin at the age of seven, and played on local radio at the age of 12. He performed on the BBC Radio often in his teenage years at their Birmingham studios, and played in film orchestras accompanying silent films. He attended Trinity College of Music in London, and played in a dance band there led by Henry Hall. This ensemble also played on the BBC and made several recordings for EMI. After losing his position in the band, he went back to Nottingham and formed his own.

In the 1930s, Stapleton toured South Africa with the Jack Payne Orchestra. Later in the decade, Stapleton and his band relocated to London; they won their own spot performing on the BBC in 1939. World War II interrupted Stapleton's musical career, as he joined the Royal Air Force late in 1939. While enlisted, he played in the RAF Symphony Orchestra.

Following the war, Stapleton played with the London Symphony Orchestra, the National Symphony Orchestra of London, and the Philharmonia Orchestra. In 1947, he recreated his band, and quickly won back slots on the BBC; among the singers he accompanied were Dick James and Frank Sinatra. As leader of the BBC Show Band, Stapleton became a fixture on the English musical scene, broadcast across the nation throughout the mid-1950s. Players in the ensemble who went on to gain a profile in their own right included Bert Weedon, Bill McGuffie, Tommy Whittle, and Matt Monro.

In 1957, the BBC disbanded the Show Band, and Stapleton immediately reassembled his own group. He even managed two chart hits in the United States with the instrumental "The Italian Theme" (#25, 1956) and "The Children's Marching Song (Nick Nack Paddy Whack)" (#13, 1959). The latter record sold one million copies. Stapleton continued to tour and record into the 1970s; in 1965 he also became head of A&R for Pye Records.

Stapleton died in 1974, at the age of 59.

Selected discography
"Elephant Tango" (1955) – UK Number 19
"Blue Star (The Medic Theme)" * (1955) – UK Number 2 – global million seller.
"The Italian Theme" (1956) – UK Number 18
"The Happy Whistler" † (1956) – UK Number 22
"Strings on Parade"  (1954) – (Decca LF 1184)
"Forgotten Dreams" (1957) – UK Number 27
"Come'n Get It" (1958) – (Decca LK 4286)
"Song of the Golden West" (1958) – (London LL 1723
"All Time Big Band Hits" (1959?) –  (Richmond Stereo, a product of London Records)

*Cyril Stapleton Orchestra featuring Julie Dawn

†Cyril Stapleton Orchestra featuring Desmond Lane, penny whistle

References

External links
[ Biography at Allmusic.com]

1914 births
1974 deaths
English jazz bandleaders
English violinists
British male violinists
Freemasons of the United Grand Lodge of England
People from Mapperley
Royal Air Force personnel of World War II
20th-century violinists
20th-century English musicians
20th-century British male musicians
British male jazz musicians
BBC Big Band members